WISEPA J173835.53+273258.9 (abbreviated WISE 1738+2732) is a brown dwarf of spectral class Y0, located in constellation Hercules at 25.5 light-years from Earth.

History of observations

Discovery
WISE 1738+2732 was discovered in 2011 from data, collected by Wide-field Infrared Survey Explorer (WISE) Earth-orbiting satellite — NASA infrared-wavelength 40 cm (16 in) space telescope, which mission lasted from December 2009 to February 2011. WISE 1738+2732 has two discovery papers: Kirkpatrick et al. (2011) and Cushing et al. (2011), however, basically with the same authors and published nearly simultaneously.

Kirkpatrick et al. presented discovery of 98 new found by WISE brown dwarf systems with components of spectral types M, L, T and Y, among which also was WISE 1738+2732.
Cushing et al. presented discovery of seven brown dwarfs — one of T9.5 type, and six of Y-type — first members of the Y spectral class, ever discovered and spectroscopically confirmed, including "archetypal member" of the Y spectral class WISE 1828+2650, and WISE 1738+2732. These seven objects are also the faintest seven of 98 brown dwarfs, presented in Kirkpatrick et al. (2011).

Distance
Currently the most accurate distance estimate of WISE 2056+1459 is a trigonometric parallax, published in 2014 by Beichman et al.: 0.128 ± 0.010 arcsec, corresponding to a distance 7.8 pc, or 25.5 ly.

Space motion
WISE 1738+2732 has proper motion of about 451 milliarcseconds per year.

Properties
The object's temperature estimate is 350 (350–400) K. Its spectrum is similar with spectrum of another Y-dwarf WISE 1405+5534.

See also
List of star systems within 25–30 light-years
WISE 0148-7202 (T9.5)
WISE 0410+1502 (Y0)
WISE 1405+5534 (Y0 (pec?))
WISE 1541-2250 (Y0.5)
WISE 1828+2650 (≥Y2)
WISE 2056+1459 (Y0)

Notes

References

Brown dwarfs
Y-type stars
Hercules (constellation)
20110901
WISE objects